Podbořany is a town in Louny District in the Ústí nad Labem Region of the Czech Republic. It has about 6,200 inhabitants. The town is known for producing hops.

Administrative parts
Town parts and villages of Buškovice, Dolánky, Hlubany, Kaštice, Kněžice, Letov, Mory, Neprobylice, Oploty, Pšov, Sýrovice and Valov are administrative parts of Podbořany.

Geography
The Dolánecký Stream flows through the town.

History
According to archaeological research, Slavic tribes lived here before the 10th century, and there was an important Slavic gord on the nearby Rubín hill. Some researchers even identify Rubín with the mythical Wogastisburg, which was the scene of the Battle of Wogastisburg.

The first written mention of Podbořany is in a deed of the monastery in Postoloprty from 1362. The village was owned by the monastery until 1426, when it was bought by the Lords of Gutštejn. During their rule, Podbořany became a market town. In 1575, as a property of the Schlick family, Podbořany received town rights.

During the 16th century, the Germanization of Podbořany started. After the Thirty Years' War, Germans became a majority. In 1945–46, the German population was expelled and they were partially replaced by Czechs from Volhynia.

Demographics

Economy
Podbořany was historically known for the mining of kaolin and the production of porcelain. Today they are one of the centres of hops cultivation.

Sights

The Church of Saints Peter and Paul is a late Baroque building from 1781. Next to the church is a rectory from 1788.

The Church of the Savior was built by German Lutherans living in and around Podbořany in 1901–1902. Today the pseudo-Romanesque building serves mainly cultural purposes.

Notable people
Radomil Eliška (1931–2019), conductor
Stanislav Štech (born 1954), politician and psychologist
Jan Pelc (born 1957), writer

Twin towns – sister cities

Podbořany is twinned with:
 Ehrenfriedersdorf, Germany
 Russi, Italy
 Spalt, Germany

References

External links

Cities and towns in the Czech Republic
Populated places in Louny District